Jan Novák (born February 9, 1979, in Havlíčkův Brod, Czechoslovakia) is a Czech professional ice hockey player. He has spent nine seasons with HC Slavia Prague in the Czech Extraliga between 1997 and 2006 and won the championship in 2003. Novák moved to the Russian Super League in 2006 and played one season for Aq Bars Kazan. He has since then also played for Skellefteå AIK of Elitserien in Sweden, but left them early in the 2007–08 season and moved to HC Slavia Praha, before on 12 January 2009 loaned to BK Mladá Boleslav. He currently plays with HC České Budějovice in the Czech Extraliga.

References

External links

1979 births
Ak Bars Kazan players
Avtomobilist Yekaterinburg players
Czech ice hockey defencemen
Czech expatriate ice hockey players in Russia
Living people
Skellefteå AIK players
HC Slavia Praha players
Motor České Budějovice players
Sportspeople from Havlíčkův Brod
Czech expatriate ice hockey players in Finland
Czech expatriate ice hockey players in Sweden
Czech expatriate sportspeople in Italy
Czech expatriate sportspeople in Austria
Expatriate ice hockey players in Italy
Expatriate ice hockey players in Austria
Czech expatriate ice hockey players in Slovakia
BK Mladá Boleslav players
HK 36 Skalica players
Graz 99ers players
SHC Fassa players
Oulun  Kärpät players